The Poland women's national 3x3 team is a national basketball team of Poland, administered by the Polski Zwiazek Koszykówki. It represents the country in international 3x3 (3 against 3) women's basketball competitions.

World Cup record

See also
Poland women's national basketball team

References

External links

Poland women's national basketball team
Women's national 3x3 basketball teams